HMS P222 was a third-batch S-class submarine built for the Royal Navy during World War II. Commissioned in 1942, the boat had an uneventful first war patrol in the Alboran Sea. She intercepted the Vichy French merchant ship SS Mitidja in July, then provided protection for an Allied convoy to Malta in Operation Pedestal the next month. The navy intended that she was to be sighted on the surface by enemy aircraft to discourage potential attacks by surface warships. Though P222 did not encounter enemy forces, the convoy arrived at its destination on 15 August after sustaining severe losses. She then reconnoitred along the coast of Algeria in advance of Operation Torch, and was attacked by a French patrol ship, but sustained no damage.

On 30 November, P222 departed Gibraltar to patrol off Naples, Italy, but failed to return at Algiers. The  claimed to have sunk a submarine with depth charges on 12 December, south-east of Capri. This remains the most probable cause of her loss, although the sinking has never been confirmed.

Design and description
The S-class submarines were intended to patrol the restricted waters of the North Sea and the Mediterranean Sea. The third batch were slightly enlarged and improved over the preceding second batch of the S class. They displaced  on the surface and  submerged. The S-class submarines had a crew of 48 officers and ratings.

For surface running, the boats were powered by two  diesel engines, each driving one propeller shaft. When submerged each propeller was driven by a  electric motor. They could reach  on the surface and  underwater.

P222 was armed with six 21-inch torpedo tubes in the bow. She carried six reload torpedoes for the bow tubes for a grand total of a dozen torpedoes. Twelve mines could be carried in lieu of the torpedoes. The boat was also equipped with a 3-inch (76 mm) deck gun. The third-batch S-class boats were fitted with either a Type 129AR or 138 ASDIC system and a Type 291 or 291W early-warning radar.

Construction and career
Ordered on 4 April 1940 as part of the 1940 Naval Programme, P222 was laid down on 10 August by Vickers Armstrong at their shipyard in Barrow-in-Furness. She was launched on 20 September 1941. On 2 May 1942, she shifted from the builder's yard to Holy Loch, where she was commissioned two days later. The submarine was lost before a name could be given to her, she is known as "P222", her pennant number. After undergoing training, P222 arrived at Elderslie on 25 May, then sailed for Kames Bay on 1 June.

On 29 and 30 June, she conducted training exercises off Gibraltar with several other British ships. P222 then departed on 2 July for her first war patrol, in the Alboran Sea. She returned to port on 10 July, having sighted no enemy ships. After additional exercises, she departed Gibraltar again on 18 July with orders to patrol off the west coast of Sardinia. On 28 July, the boat returned to port, ending her second war patrol.

P222 departed Gibraltar on 2 August for a patrol in the Sicilian Channel, with additional orders to provide cover for Operation Pedestal, a British convoy to carry supplies to Malta. On 13 August, along with seven other Royal Navy submarines, she accompanied the convoy on the surface; the intent was that the submarines would be sighted by enemy aircraft and discourage potential attacks from enemy warships. Though the boat did not encounter enemy forces, the convoy operation was a British strategic success, and P222 returned to Gibraltar on 22 August.

After an uneventful patrol from 1 to 19 September, the boat was ordered to conduct reconnaissance along landing beaches east of Oran, in preparation for the Allied landings in North Africa. On 8 November, she was attacked by a Vichy French , which dropped several depth charges but caused no damage. P222 returned to port on 19 November 1942.

P222 left Gibraltar to patrol off Naples on 30 November. She sent a number of messages on 7 December, but after that date no further communication was received. She failed to arrive at Algiers on her due date and was reported overdue on 21 December. The  claimed to have sunk a submarine with depth charges on 12 December, south-east of Capri. This remains the most probable cause of the submarine's loss, but there has been no confirmation. Her wreck was claimed to have been found off Cape Negro, Tunisia, by a Belgian amateur diver, but that has not been confirmed. This last claim can be dismissed as signals to and from the submarine clearly show she was following a route that skirted the coast of southern Sardinia and thus could not have strayed in Tunisian waters.

Notes

References

External links
 HMS P222 at Uboat.net
 SUBMARINE LOSSES 1904 TO PRESENT DAY

 

British S-class submarines (1931)
Royal Navy ship names
Ships built in Barrow-in-Furness
1941 ships
World War II submarines of the United Kingdom
Lost submarines of the United Kingdom
Warships lost in combat with all hands
Missing submarines of World War II
Maritime incidents in December 1942
Submarines sunk by Italian warships